"Max Don't Have Sex With Your Ex" is a song recorded by German Eurodance act E-Rotic, released in June 1994 as the group's debut and lead single from their first album, Sex Affairs (1995). Written and composed by David Brandes, John O'Flynn and Felix Gauder, the song hit success in Germany where it peaked at number seven. In the Netherlands, it reached number four while in Austria, it reached number 12. It also peaked at number 14 in Switzerland and number 20 in France. The song is the group's highest charting single in the United Kingdom, where it peaked at number 45 on the UK Singles Chart in June 1995.

Critical reception
British magazine Music Week gave the song three out of five, writing, "Parodying the Euro-techno sounds that have dominated the charts recently, this cautionary tug-of-love tale could be the tune sunburnt young men collapse to on the Med this summer." An editor, Alan Jones, commented, "A naff title for sure, but it's a storming house record." James Hamilton from the RM Dance Update declared it as a "nagging girl warned (quite rightly as 'It will make your life complex') although otherwise idiotically simple jaunty Euro smash".

Music video
The accompanying music video for "Max Don't Have Sex With Your Ex" was animated and directed by Hartcore. The camera descends onto Max's wife sleeping alone as Max is seen cheating on her. She later opens her eyes and discovers her husband cheating on her in his ex's apartment. The video later depicts Max and his mistress at the pool of her house, on a planet resembling a breast, and at a subway station. The wife attempts to catch them in the act using a telescope and while she takes the train at night. The video was A-listed on Germany's VIVA in December 1994.

Track listings

 CD maxi - Europe
 "Max Don't Have Sex With Your Ex" (radio edit) – 3:31
 "Max Don't Have Sex With Your Ex" (extended version) – 5:23
 "Max Don't Have Sex With Your Ex" (Hot Sex Max Mix) – 5:23

 CD single, 12" maxi – remixes
 "Max Don't Have Sex With Your Ex" (Dance The Max) – 6:12
 "Max Don't Have Sex With Your Ex" (Touch The Max) – 4:24
 "Max Don't Have Sex With Your Ex" (Rave The Max) – 5:04

Credits
 Cover artwork by I-D Büro
 Illustration by Zoran
 Produced by David Brandes, Domenico Livrano and Felix J. Gauder
 Recorded and mixed at Bros Studios, Germany
 Published by Cosima Music/Edition Birdie

Charts and certifications

Weekly charts

Year-end charts

Certifications

References

1994 debut singles
1994 songs
Animated music videos
Blow Up singles
E-Rotic songs
English-language German songs
Songs about infidelity
Songs written by David Brandes
Songs written by Bernd Meinunger